Doğlu is a village in Mezitli district which is a part of Greater Mersin, Mersin Province, Turkey. The population of Doğlu was 591. as of 2012. The  village may be an old village . But in 1800s the village was almost emptied because of an epidemic. The Ottoman government settled people from the eastern parts of the empire. The present name Doğlu may be a corrupt form of Doğulu (“of east”). The main agricultural products of the village are olive and citrus.

References

Villages in Mezitli District